Len Deighton's Action Cook Book is a 1965 collection of cookery strips (known as a cookstrip, an invention of Len Deighton's from his days as a student at the Royal College of Art) originally published in the Observer newspaper, with additional information and notes. Aimed at "an audience of men unskilled at knowing their way around the kitchen", the book has been described as a cult classic from the period and helped pave the transition from cooking being only for women, into being a sophisticated expectation of a modern man.

The book was reissued in 2009 by Harper Perennial (an imprint of HarperCollins) with original content and artwork, the 2nd edition of the cover artwork, and an additional updated introduction.

In popular culture
At least one of the cookstrips from Observer is pinned up in Deighton's spy hero's kitchen in the 1965 film of his 1962 novel The IPCRESS File.

The cookbook was mentioned in an episode of The Supersizers..., focusing on the extremely high quantities of alcohol required for a 1970s cocktail party. Here Len recommends half a 70 cl bottle (35 cl) of hard spirit (e.g. rum, vodka, etc.) per person every two hours of a party, increasing to three-quarters (52.5 cl) of a bottle per person after 2 hours "since drinking will increase if they haven't gone home by then" (p126). This equates to 87.5 cl of spirits per person for a four-hour party.

See also

 Len Deighton bibliography

References

1965 non-fiction books
British cookbooks
Books by Len Deighton